Michael Lowenstern (born August 23, 1968) is an American musician, composer and educator, specializing in bass clarinet. He is well known for his YouTube channel Earspasm and for his many recordings featuring the bass clarinet as a solo instrument in classical, jazz, and electronica formats.

Early life 
Lowenstern was born in Chicago, Illinois and grew up in the Hyde Park neighborhood on the city's South Side. His father Edward was a serial entrepreneur, most well known for his work developing the field of consumer debt consolidation in the late 1950s, and his mother Lois, a real estate appraiser for ABN Amro Bank. The youngest of four, he has one brother, Ken, and two sisters, Linda and Beth. Attending the University of Chicago Laboratory School beginning in 1973, he began playing the clarinet at age 8. He regularly shares his story of that instrument: "I had an old instrument my mom used in high school, and my sister used in high school, and dammit, I was going to play it, because my parent's weren't about to 'buy me an instrument that I would just quit in a few years.'" He was moved by his band director to bass clarinet after two years "because I was holding the band back and I would do less damage on the bass clarinet."

His first clarinet teacher was John Bruce Yeh, of the Chicago Symphony Orchestra, whom his father contacted through a mutual friend, Dale Clevenger, the orchestra's principal French horn player. He spent summers at the National Music Camp (now Interlochen Arts Camp) in Interlochen, Michigan, graduating in 1985 from the Interlochen Arts Academy. While at Interlochen, Lowenstern studied with Richard MacDowell.

He attended the Eastman School of Music, graduating with a bachelor's degree in Music with a Performer's Certificate in 1989, studying with Charles Neidich, and immediately received a Fulbright grant to move to Amsterdam,The Netherlands, to continue his studies with bass clarinetist, Harry Sparnaay. Post-graduate studies continued with Charles Neidich at the State University of New York at Stony Brook, where he received his MM and PhD in music and composition. It is at Stony Brook where he became interested in computer music, having been one of the early beta-testers of Cycling74's Max software. It is also at Stony Brook where he met and begain work with his long-time collaborator, violinist Todd Reynolds.

Performing career 
In 1994, Lowenstern moved to Brooklyn, New York and began performing and recording with various ensembles, including Steve Reich and Musicians, Saxophonist John Zorn, The Klezmatics, and The Chamber Music Society of Lincoln Center. In 1996, his first album, Spasm, was released by New World Records, which is a collection of contemporary classical Bass Clarinet compositions. In 2000, Lowenstern joined the New Jersey Symphony Orchestra as Bass Clarinetist, and performed on two Grammy Award winning albums with the ensemble under Zdenek Macal. That same year, his second album,1985 was released by Capstone Records.

In mid-2005, Lowenstern made a major shift in his career, and resigned from all of his regular ensembles, including the Chamber Music Society and the New Jersey Symphony, deciding to focus entirely on his solo compositions and performances. Between 2003 and 2015, Lowenstern self-released several albums, though his imprint Earspasm Music. During this period, Lowenstern served on the faculties of New York University, the Juilliard School, and the Manhattan School of Music, teaching bass clarinet in their Contemporary Performance Program.

Lowenstern's YouTube channel was established in early 2006, but early content was removed, and few videos exist prior to 2011. At that time, Lowenstern began making and posting videos on that platform for a student, so she could listen to her etudes between lessons. The channel grew consistently over the decade, and is now one of the highest-ranked clarinet channels by viewership and subscriptions. A number of his videos have created some controversy in the clarinet world, and he is often the subject of intense debate on the long-established Clarinet Pages of Woodwind.org and Sax On The Web. In an interview from July, 2021, Lowenstern is quoted as saying "I don't take myself, or music, too seriously, and I think that offends some people."

Advertising career 
In the late 1990s, Lowenstern began working at large advertising agencies in New York City "as a way to supplement his habit of eating and paying rent." Once retired from orchestra work, he began work full time at MRM/McCann digital agency. In 2008, Lowenstern moved to R/GA to found that agency's Digital Advertising group. It was at R/GA that Lowenstern won several industry awards, including two Cannes Lions, OneShow pencils for his work on Barack Obama's presidential campaign, and several Webby Awards. In 2017, Lowenstern was hired by Amazon to lead creative strategy and development for their automotive advertising Brand Innovation Lab.

Personal life 
Michael is married to clarinetist Katherine Cooke, and together they have one daughter, Ariel (born August, 1999). He is a certificated pilot, and enjoys flying his small 4-seater 1972 Piper Arrow, which he calls a "Toyota with wings."

Recordings

References

External links
 Earspasm Music
YouTube

1968 births
Living people
Bass clarinetists
American male composers
21st-century American composers
Musicians from Chicago
Manhattan School of Music faculty
Contemporary classical music performers
Stony Brook University alumni
21st-century clarinetists
21st-century American male musicians